ATP-binding cassette sub-family D member 4 is a protein that in humans is encoded by the ABCD4 gene.

The protein encoded by this gene is a member of the superfamily of ATP-binding cassette (ABC) transporters. ABC proteins transport various molecules across extra- and intra-cellular membranes. ABC genes are divided into seven distinct subfamilies (ABC1, MDR/TAP, MRP, ALD, OABP, GCN20, White). This protein is a member of the ALD subfamily, which is involved in peroxisomal import of fatty acids and/or fatty acyl-CoAs in the organelle. All known peroxisomal ABC transporters are half transporters which require a partner half transporter molecule to form a functional homodimeric or heterodimeric transporter. The function of this peroxisomal membrane protein is unknown. However, it is speculated that it may function as a heterodimer for another peroxisomal ABC transporter and, therefore, may modify the adrenoleukodystrophy phenotype. It may also play a role in the process of peroxisome biogenesis. Alternative splicing results in at least two different transcript variants, one which is protein-coding and one which is probably not protein-coding.

References

Further reading

External links 
 
 

ATP-binding cassette transporters